Under the Big Black Sun is the third studio album by American rock band X, and their major-label debut. It was released on Elektra Records in July 1982 and reissued on Rhino Records in 2001 with bonus tracks. It was re-released in its original format by Fat Possum Records in 2018.

The cover art illustration was drawn by Alfred Harris.

Track listing
All tracks written by John Doe and Exene Cervenka except where noted.

Side A

 "The Hungry Wolf" – 3:45
 "Motel Room in My Bed" – 2:32
 "Riding with Mary" – 3:40
 "Come Back to Me" – 3:43
 "Under the Big Black Sun" – 3:23

Side B

 "Because I Do" – 2:21
 "Blue Spark" – 2:06
 "Dancing with Tears in My Eyes" (Al Dubin, Joe Burke) – 2:20
 "Real Child of Hell" – 2:59
 "How I (Learned My Lesson)" – 2:12
 "The Have Nots" – 4:44

Bonus tracks (2001 reissue)

 "Riding with Mary" (Single Version) – 3:12
 "X Rewrites 'El Paso'" (Rehearsal)/"Because I Do" (TV Mix/Instrumental) (Marty Robbins, Cervenka, Doe) – 2:56
 "Universal Corner" (Live) – 4:08
 "Breathless" (Single Mix) (Otis Blackwell) – 2:20
 "How I (Learned My Lesson)" (Live) – 2:20

Personnel
X
John Doe – bass, vocals
Exene Cervenka – vocals
Billy Zoom – guitar, saxophone, clarinet
D.J. Bonebrake – drums, marimba vibes, percussion
Additional personnel
Ray Manzarek – keyboards on "Riding with Mary" (Single version)

Charts

References 

X (American band) albums
1982 albums
Elektra Records albums
Albums produced by Ray Manzarek